The Javan sunbird or scarlet sunbird (Aethopyga mystacalis) is a species of bird in the family Nectariniidae.
It is endemic to Java and Bali, Indonesia.
Its natural habitats are subtropical or tropical moist lowland forest and subtropical or tropical moist montane forest.

References

Javan sunbird
Birds of Java
Birds of Bali
Javan sunbird
Taxonomy articles created by Polbot